The acuminate horseshoe bat (Rhinolophus acuminatus) is a species of bat in the family Rhinolophidae. It is found in Southeast Asia. It lives in forests and urban areas.

Taxonomy and etymology
It was described as a new species in 1871 by German naturalist Wilhelm Peters. Its species name "acuminatus" is Latin for "pointed." The inspiration for this name was perhaps its "sharply upwards pointed sella."

Description
It weighs .

Biology and ecology
It is nocturnal, roosting in sheltered places during the day such as inside caves or on the undersides of palm leaves. It roosts in small colonies.

Range and habitat
It is found in several countries in Southeast Asia, including Cambodia, Indonesia, Laos, Malaysia, Myanmar, Thailand, and Vietnam.

Conservation
It is currently evaluated as least concern by the IUCN—its lowest conservation priority. Its range includes protected areas. It lacks major threats, although cave disturbance by humans is a local threat.

References

Rhinolophidae
Mammals described in 1871
Taxa named by Wilhelm Peters
Bats of Southeast Asia
Taxonomy articles created by Polbot